Roland Douatte (7 December 1921, in Paris – 16 December 1992, in Paris) was a French classical violinist and conductor.

A self-taught violinist, he founded his own chamber orchestra, the "Collegium Musicum of Paris" in 1952.

Roland Douatte is one of the first conductors to be interested and to make Vivaldi's The Four Seasons and other musics of the Baroque era known, including Delalande's Simphonies pour les soupers du Roi.

References

External links 
 Discography (Discogs)
 Roland Douatte (Bach Cantatas Website)
 Roland Douatte and Orchestre... - Gymnopédie no. 1 (YouTube)

French male conductors (music)
20th-century French male classical violinists
1921 births
Musicians from Paris
1992 deaths
20th-century French conductors (music)